Southern Shorthaul Railroad is an Australian rail freight services operator in New South Wales and Victoria. The company also provides workshop services, such as rolling stock manufacturing and wagon and locomotive maintenance.

History

Southern Shorthaul Railroad was established in December 2003, when the remains of Great Northern Rail Services were purchased from Chicago Freight Car Leasing Australia.

Current rail operations include grain haulage for Arrow Commodities, Emerald Grain, Newcastle AGRI Terminal, Allied Mills in NSW and VIC and George Weston Foods, intermodal operations for Fletchers International Exports and Grainforce in NSW, coal services for Centennial Coal in NSW, infrastructure trains for RailCorp in NSW, locomotive and wagon maintenance services for Pacific National and V/Line in Victoria, EMU deliveries for Metro Trains Melbourne and various transfer workings in NSW and Victoria.

In 2010, SSR entered the coal haulage market. Operating on behalf of Centennial Coal, it operates trains from the NSW Western Coalfields (Airly, Clarence, Charbon and Lidsdale collieries) and Newstan Colliery to ports at Kooragang Island, Carrington and Port Kembla.
In 2018, the company began Hunter Valley operations, using 3 CEY class and 90 PHTH hoppers.

The company also refurbishes and repairs locomotives and rolling stock at the former Bendigo Workshops in Victoria. It also has a maintenance facility at the Lithgow State Mine Heritage Park & Railway.

In May 2012, SSR purchased GM3 from Clyde Engineering and transferred it from Kelso to Lithgow for overhaul.

In 2012, SSR formed a subsidiary, BRM Leasing. In October 2012, the name was changed to Consolidated Rail Leasing. Some of the SSR fleet has been made available for lease through CRL.

In 2013, SSR celebrated 10 years in business, created a special logo, and painted the then-new SSR class in a variation of its standard yellow and black livery. In December 2013, SSR began operating a container service from Kelso to Port Botany. The train primarily carries containerised grain, and has considerably grown in size since it first started running. In 2014, SSR commenced operating grain services in New South Wales for George Weston Foods.

In 2015, S317 and GM27 were repainted into a livery reminiscent of the one used by Australian National on the rebuilt CLP classes in 1993.

2016 was a year of rapid expansion for SSR, when it bought the Greentrains locomotive fleet (excluding 8026 and T383 which Greentrains retained), which meant that SSR to no longer had to hire motive power, such as the VL class locomotives, and could expand its operations. SSR also purchased 180 coal wagons, after the Leigh Creek coal train ceased running. SSR has since converted them into grain wagons, by modifying the bottom discharge doors and fitting fibreglass lids, and have formed three grain trains, ranging from 50 to 60 wagons.

In 2017, SSR continued to expand, when it won the contract to perform maintenance on Pacific National broad gauge locomotives in Victoria. That required the company to operate light engine transfers between Bendigo and South Dynon. It has delivered new Metro X'Trapolis EMUs from Alstom's Ballarat North Workshops to Metro's Epping Workshops, as well as performing maintenance and overhauls on some V/Line locomotives and passenger rolling stock at the Bendigo workshops.

SSR won the Allied Mills contract from Pacific National. That led to them serving Allied Mills facilities in Maldon, New South Wales and Kensington, Victoria. Due to the Kensington facility being located on the broad gauge network, locomotives S302 and S317, and 10 BGKF and 9 BGGX wagons, were converted to broad gauge, and new standard gauge wagons were purchased to service the NSW facility.

Victorian grain operations were further ramped up when SSR won a contract with Emerald Grain to provide grain services from Southern NSW and Western Victoria for export through Appleton Dock.

In 2018, SSR commenced operating monster 100+ wagon grain trains into South Australia and Victoria to help alleviate the effects of a drought in New South Wales. South Australian operations commenced in June and Victorian trains commenced in September. The operations were usually powered by x5 C classes, but SSR, BRM, RL, G, 49 and 45 class locomotives have been used. The operations have continued into 2019.

In August 2020, CLF1, one of the company's latest acquisitions, was repainted into SSR black and yellow, the first locomotive to be painted into that livery in almost a decade. It was named "Milton Bromwich", after one of the three directors of Southern Shorthaul Railroad.

Fleet

SSR operates a combination of owned and leased locomotives:

Owned
As at June 2018, SSR owned and operated the following locomotives:

Previously Leased
42 class: 4204
47 class: 4701, 4702, 4708, 4716
C class: C501, C502, C503, C508
CM class: CM3302, CM3303, CM3306
VL class: VL353, VL354, VL355, VL356, VL357, VL361
CF class CF4404, CF4411, CF4412

Other
As of May 2020, SSR operated the following locomotives on behalf of other owners:
CEY class: CEY001 to CEY007 – Used on Centennial Coal services from the Western Coalfields to Kooragang Island or occasionally to Port Kembla. They are also infrequently used on services to Newstan Colliery, Eraring Power Station and Vales Point Power Station
FIE class: FIE001 to FIE003 – Used on the Fletcher's International Exports container service between Dubbo and Port Botany. They are also used to transport cement from Fletcher's Dubbo terminal to Hermidale on the Cobar railway line
1200 class: From August 2017, 1201 and 1202 were leased from National Railway Equipment Company on an as needed basis, commonly used on branch lines where heavier mainline units cannot go.
Steamrail Victoria locomotives S313, T356, T364, T395 and Y164 see intermittent use when additional broad gauge power is required.
Seymour Railway Heritage Centre locomotives C501, S303 and T357 see intermittent use when additional standard gauge power is required.
PHC class PHC001 and PHC002. Owned by Crawfords Freight Lines and used on container services between Werris Creek and Port Botany.

References

Freight railway companies of Australia
Railway companies established in 2003
Railway rolling stock leasing companies of Australia
2003 establishments in Australia